Summit Township is a civil township of Mason County in the U.S. state of Michigan. The population was 924 at the 2010 census.

History
Summit Township was organized in 1860. Some say Summit Township was named from its lofty elevation, while others believe it was named from the optimistic spirit of its organizers.

Geography

Communities
Fairview in an unincorporated community in the township.  It had a post office from 1860 until 1876.

Demographics
As of the census of 2000, there were 1,021 people, 398 households, and 308 families residing in the township. The racial makeup of the township was 97.36% White, 0.10% African American, 0.59% Native American, 0.10% Asian, 0.10% Pacific Islander, 0.88% from other races, and 0.88% from two or more races. Hispanic or Latino of any race were 2.35% of the population.

There were 398 households, out of which 29.6% had children under the age of 18 living with them, 70.6% were married couples living together, 5.3% had a female householder with no husband present, and 22.4% were non-families. 18.6% of all households were made up of individuals, and 8.8% had someone living alone who was 65 years of age or older.  The average household size was 2.56 and the average family size was 2.91.

In the township the population was spread out, with 22.7% under the age of 18, 5.4% from 18 to 24, 21.6% from 25 to 44, 29.6% from 45 to 64, and 20.7% who were 65 years of age or older.  The median age was 45 years. For every 100 females, there were 105.8 males.  For every 100 females age 18 and over, there were 100.8 males.

The median income for a household in the township was $44,432, and the median income for a family was $50,000. Males had a median income of $35,875 versus $23,625 for females. The per capita income for the township was $20,335.  About 1.0% of families and 3.1% of the population were below the poverty line, including 0.8% of those under age 18 and 7.2% of those age 65 or over.

References

Notes

Sources

Townships in Mason County, Michigan
Townships in Michigan
Populated places established in 1860
1860 establishments in Michigan